Elisa Lohmann (born 22 July 1998 in Flörsheim) is a German volleyball player.

Career 
She participated in the 2015 FIVB Volleyball Girls' U18 World Championship,  and the 2018 FIVB Volleyball Women's Nations League.

References

External links 
 FIVB profile
 
 https://www.schweriner-sc.com/mannschaft/1-liga-saison-201718/

1993 births
Living people
German women's volleyball players
People from Main-Taunus-Kreis
Sportspeople from Darmstadt (region)